Samir Chanda (1957 – 18 August 2011) was an Indian art director and production designer across Indian cinema, including Hindi, Bengali, Malayalam and Tamil, most known for his work in films like Yodha (1992), Dil Se.. (1998), Guru (2007), Omkara (2006), Rang De Basanti (2006), and Raavan (2010).

He also directed a Bengali film, Ek Nadir Galpo (2008) starring Mithun Chakraborty. It was Indian entries for the Asian, African and Latin American Competition segment of the 38th International Film Festival of India (IFFI), in Goa He was awarded the National Film Award for Best Art Direction four times, including Netaji Subhas Chandra Bose: The Forgotten Hero (2005) directed by Shyam Benegal.

Career
A trained painter from Government College of Art & Craft, Kolkata, he moved to Mumbai and started his career as an assistant to noted art director Nitish Roy working in films like, Mandi (1983) by Shyam Benegal, Mrinal Sen. Subsequently, started handling films independently as art director and production designer, with Subhash Ghai's Ram Lakhan (1989). Over the years he worked with directors like Shyam Benegal, Sangeeth Sivan, Vishal Bhardwaj, Rakesh Omprakash Mehra, Gautam Ghosh and Mani Ratnam.

For film Delhi-6 directed by Rakeysh Omprakash Mehra, Chanda recreated inner lanes of Old Delhi at Sambhar town in Rajasthan, as it has similar architecture. Later, for some scenes, historic Jama Masjid was digitally added to the frame as a backdrop.

Wasiq Khan, who later did Gangs of Wasseypur (2012) and Goliyon Ki Raasleela Ram-Leela (2013), started his career as an assistant art director with Chanda in films, Mani Ratnam's Iruvar (1997) and Shyam Benegal's Hari-Bhari (2000), before starting out on his own.

He died in Mumbai on 18 August 2011, at the age of 53. Reportedly, he suffered a drug reaction to a painkiller he had taken for a toothache earlier that day, and suffered a heart attack. He was rushed a hospital in Malad, Mumbai, where he died within an hour.

Filmography

Awards
 National Film Award
 1992: Best Art Direction for Rukmavati Ki Haveli
 1993: Best Art Direction for Rudaali
 2005: Best Art Direction for Netaji Subhas Chandra Bose: The Forgotten Hero
 2009:Best Art Direction for Delhi-6
 Filmfare Award
 2007: Best Art Direction for Omkara
 2008: Best Art Direction for Guru

References

External links
 
 Samir Chanda, Filmography at Bollywood Hungama

Indian production designers
Indian art directors
1957 births
2011 deaths
Government College of Art & Craft alumni
University of Calcutta alumni
Filmfare Awards winners
20th-century Indian designers
Artists from Mumbai
21st-century Indian designers
Best Production Design National Film Award winners